Caroline Langrishe (born 10 January 1958) is an English actress.

Early life
Born in London, Langrishe is the elder daughter of Patrick Nicholas Langrishe  (1932–2022), of The Manor House, Sellindge, Kent, a Lieutenant in the 11th Hussars, later Major in the Leicestershire and Derbyshire Yeomanry, and Penelope Jill, daughter of Royal Navy Lieutenant-Commander Kenneth Horley. Patrick Langrishe was the second son of Sir Terence Hume Langrishe, 6th Baronet (1895–1973) and brother of Sir Hercules Langrishe, 7th Baronet. 

In 1964, Caroline moved with her parents and sister to Kent, where she grew up. She trained at the Elmhurst Ballet School, but after deciding that she could not become a soloist for the Royal Ballet, moved into acting.

Career
In 1976, Langrishe made her acting debut when she appeared in the BBC production of The Glittering Prizes. The next year, she played the role of Kitty in the BBC1 adaptation of Anna Karenina, before working in the theatre with Peter Gill. Amongst her roles was Anya in Gill's 1978 production of The Cherry Orchard Her first big part was in the 1978 British adaptation of Les Misérables. That same year, she made her big-screen debut, playing the part of Loretta, the receptionist to Robert Morley's character in Who Is Killing the Great Chefs of Europe?

She also starred as Jane Winters in the futuristic BBC Play for Today episode The Flipside of Dominick Hide (1980) and its sequel, Another Flip for Dominick (1982) both by Jeremy Paul and Alan Gibson. She played Janet Hollywell, wife of Fred Hollywell, in a film adaptation of Charles Dickens' A Christmas Carol (1984), starring George C. Scott. She also appeared in one episode of Minder broadcast in 1984, as Julie, a journalist. Onstage, she played in Kenneth Branagh's production of Twelfth Night. She became a leading actress, taking the female lead in the BBC detective series Pulaski (1987) and appearing in several episodes of Chancer (1990).

Langrishe is perhaps best known for her role as Charlotte Cavendish in the BBC series Lovejoy in which she appeared for two series in 1993–1994. After appearing in some episodes of The Good Sex Guide in the mid-1990s, she appeared in Sharpe's Regiment (1996) and Sharpe's Justice (1997) as the Dowager Countess Anne Camoynes. She played the unhappy landlady to Hywel Bennett's James Shelley in the seventh series of Shelley on ITV. She has also appeared in Heartbeat, in the episode Echoes of the Past that aired in December 1998. In 1999 she starred in Brotherly Love. From 2001 to 2007, she appeared as regular character Georgina Channing, Donald Sinden's daughter, alongside Martin Shaw in the BBC TV drama Judge John Deed, playing his ex-wife and then joined the BBC medical drama Casualty, playing executive director Marilyn Fox.

In 2010, she played Ros, an 'older woman' in an open marriage in Pete Versus Life on Channel 4. In September 2010, she played the character of Susan Fincher in an episode of Midsomer Murders entitled Blood on the Saddle. In late December 2011, she appeared in teen soap opera, Hollyoaks as Barney Harper-McBride's mother. In December 2014, she appeared as Sheila in the Sky1 television film adaptation of the M. C. Beaton novel Agatha Raisin and the Quiche of Death.

Personal life
Langrishe married the actor Patrick Drury in London on 15 November 1984, but the couple divorced in 1995 after having two daughters. She currently lives in Putney and her hobbies include rowing, running, swimming and tennis.

Filmography

Film

Television

References

External links
 

1958 births
Living people
Actresses from London
Actresses from Kent
English film actresses
English stage actresses
English television actresses
Caroline
People educated at the Elmhurst School for Dance